The Tezu Jama Mosque is a  mosque located in Tezu in Arunachal Pradesh in the India.
The Tezu Jama Masjid is a local Islamic shrine where the residents offer prayers.

The idyllic place, Tezu, comes in Lohit district of Arunachal Pradesh. The small township is familiar for the religious milieu . The beautiful town is a tourist attraction in Arunachal Pradesh. With its rivers and valleys, the small place is literally a paradise for the visitors. Tezu Jama Masjid  is an attractive place for everybody because of its grandeur   in architecture. Located in the main town of Tezu, the mosque is frequented by hundreds of people every day for everyday prayer session.

Prayer
This mosque is a venue of celebration during festivals of Id-Ul-Fitr and Id-Ul-Zuha, by the local Muslim community. The mosque hold prayer sessions every day.

References

Mosques in Arunachal Pradesh
Lohit district